is the name of two subway stations in Minato, Tokyo, Japan, one operated by Tokyo Metro and the other by Toei Subway.

Lines
This station is served by the Tokyo Metro Namboku Line and Toei Ōedo Line. The station is numbered N-04 for the Namboku Line and E-22 for the Ōedo Line.

Station layout

Tokyo Metro
The Namboku Line station consists of an island platform serving two tracks. The ticket gates are on the first basement floor, and the platforms are on the third basement floor.

Toei
The Toei Ōedo Line station also consists of an island platform serving two tracks. The ticket gates are on the fourth basement floor, and the platforms are on the sixth basement floor.

History
The Namboku Line station opened on September 26, 2000, and the Ōedo Line platforms opened on December 12 of the same year.

The station facilities of the Namboku Line were inherited by Tokyo Metro after the privatization of the Teito Rapid Transit Authority (TRTA) in 2004.

Surrounding area
 Zenpuku-ji
 Roppongi Hills, TV Asahi
 Roppongi High School
 Snoopy Museum Tokyo
 Nanzan elementary school
 Higashimachi elementary school
 Ichinohashi Park
 Mindan, VANK
 Temple University Japan

See also
 List of railway stations in Japan
 Azabu

References

External links

 Tokyo Metro Azabu-juban Station information
 Toei Azabu-juban Station information

Railway stations in Japan opened in 2000
Tokyo Metro Namboku Line
Toei Ōedo Line
Stations of Tokyo Metropolitan Bureau of Transportation
Stations of Tokyo Metro
Railway stations in Tokyo